Nicole Duval Hesler (born  April 8, 1945) is  the  first woman chief justice of Quebec. She obtained a Bachelor of Arts from Marianopolis College in 1964. Duval Hesler was admitted to the Quebec Bar in 1968, appointed to the Superior Court of Quebec in 1992 and appointed to the Court of Appeal of Quebec in 2006. On October 7, 2011, Prime Minister Stephen Harper named Duval Hesler the chief justice of the Court of Appeal.

Hesler retired on April 8, 2020.

References 

1945 births
Living people
Canadian women judges
Judges in Quebec
People from Quebec City
Women chief justices